TDRS-3, known before launch as TDRS-C, is an American communications satellite, of first generation, which is operated by NASA as part of the Tracking and Data Relay Satellite System. It was constructed by TRW, and is based on a custom satellite bus which was used for all seven first generation TDRS satellites.

Launch

The TDRS-C satellite was launched aboard  during the STS-26 mission in 1988; the first Shuttle flight since the Challenger disaster which had resulted in the loss of the previous TDRS satellite, TDRS-B. Discovery launched from Launch Complex 39B at the Kennedy Space Center at 15:37:00 UTC on 29 September 1988. TDRS-C was deployed from Discovery around six hours after launch, and was raised to geostationary orbit by means of an Inertial Upper Stage.

Deployment
The two-stage solid-propellent Inertial Upper Stage made two burns. The first stage burn occurred shortly after deployment from Discovery, and placed the satellite into a geosynchronous transfer orbit. At 04:30 UTC on 30 September 1988, it reached apogee, and the second stage fired, placing TDRS-C into geosynchronous orbit. At this point it received its operational designation. Although the TDRS-2 designation had not been assigned, TDRS-C was given the designation TDRS-3 as NASA did not want to reuse the designation which had been intended for the STS-51-L payload. It was briefly placed at a longitude 151° West of the Greenwich Meridian, before being moved to 171.0° West before the end of 1988, from where it provided communications services to spacecraft in Earth orbit, including Space Shuttles. In 1990, it was relocated to 174.0° West, and again in 1991 to 62.0° West. In 1994, it returned to 171.0° West. In June 1995, it was moved to 85.0° East, from where it was used primarily for communications with spacecraft such as the Compton Gamma Ray Observatory and the Hubble Space Telescope. In October 2009, as NASA began decommissioning TDRS-1, TDRS-3 was moved to 49.0° West, where it remains in storage as of 2020.

See also 

 List of TDRS satellites

References

Communications satellites in geostationary orbit
Spacecraft launched in 1988
TDRS satellites
Spacecraft launched by the Space Shuttle